8bitpeoples is an artist collective and netlabel centered in New York City that focuses on chiptune aesthetics, which is heavily influenced by vintage videogames. 8bitpeoples was founded in 1999 by Jeremiah "Nullsleep" Johnson and Mike "Tangible" Hanlon. It is run by Johnson and Joshua "Bit Shifter" Davis.

Many artists who have appeared on 8bitpeoples have also appeared on compilations on other labels, most notably Astralwerks' 8 Bit Operators compilation, a collection of Kraftwerk songs done in the 8-bit style. 8bitpeoples is also involved in the organization of the Blip Festival, which features 8-bit musicians, often including those on the 8bitpeoples roster.

They provide the vast majority of their releases for free via their website, including printable covers and inserts so that anyone can manufacture a hard copy of their releases.

Current members 
 Bit Shifter
 minusbaby
 No Carrier
 Nullsleep
 openBack
 Otro
 Random
 Trash80
 Twilight Electric
 x|k

Guest artists 

 505
 8GB
 A.M.U
 Alex Mauer
 Amor Antiquita
 Anamanaguchi
 Animal Style
 AY Riders
 Binärpilot
 Bud Melvin
 Cheapshot
 Coleco Music
 Commie64
 Coova
 Cornbeast
 Counter Reset
 Damo
 David Sugar
 Divag
 Dma-Sc
 Doomcloud
 Dorothy's Magic Bag
 Drx
 exileFaker
 Firebrand Boy
 Frank Fitus
 Gijs Gieskes
 Glomag
 Gordon Strombola
 Goto80
 Gumshoe
 
 Handheld
 I, Cactus
 IAYD
 Jellica
 knife city
 Kplecraft
 Kris Keyser
 L-Tron
 Linde
 lissajou
 little-scale
 Lo-Bat
 M-.-n
 Manic
 Marcer
 Mark DeNardo
 Mesu Kasumai
 Mr. Spastic
 Paza
 Phlogiston
 Psilodump
 Rainbowdragoneyes
 Receptors
 Role Model
 Rugar
 RushJet1
 Sabastian Boaz
 Sabrepulse
 Saskrotch
 she
 Sievert
 Snoopdroop
 StarPause
 Starscream
 Stu
 Tangible
 Tao
 Ten and Tracer
 Tet
 The 8bitpeoples
 The Depreciation Guild
 The J. Arthur Keenes Band
 The X-Dump
 Timbral
 USK
 Vim
 Virt
 Xinon
 Yerzmyey
 YM Rockerz
 Yuppster
 ZEN ALBATROSS

Compilations/Samplers 
 Colors (8BP001)
 Axel F (8BP028)
 The 8bits of Christmas (8BP038)
 8BP050 (8BP050)
 Blip Festival 2008: 32 Live Recordings (8BP100)
 Reformat: A Tribute To Bit Shifter's Information Chase (8BP118)

See also 
List of record labels
Chiptune
Bitpop

References

External links
 Official website
 New York Times: Air On a Game Boy- Mentions 8bitpeoples artists Nullsleep and Bit Shifter.
 Wired Magazine: Blip Festival - 8 Bit Is Enough Coverage of Blip Festival
 nbcnews.com – Play That Funky Music, Game Boy – Mentions 8bitpeoples, contains brief interview with Bit Shifter
  Name That Chiptune: The Growing Niche of 8-Bit Music Review of Blip Festival, including Bit Shifter and Nullsleep’s performances
 BBC Click: Webscape Discussion of the 8bitpeoples website from the BBC show Click
 Tribeca Trib: Chip Hop Show Review of Nullsleep, Bit Shifter, and Mark DeNardo, owners of/artists on the 8bitpeoples label

Record labels established in 1999
American independent record labels
Electronic music record labels
Indie rock record labels
1999 establishments in New York City